Zdzisław Ludwik Krzyszkowiak (3 August 1929 – 23 March 2003) was a Polish track and field athlete, winner of the 3000 metre steeplechase at the 1960 Summer Olympics.

Born in Wielichowo, Greater Poland Voivodeship, Krzyszkowiak won 13 Polish National Championship titles in long-distance and cross-country events.

Krzyszkowiak rose to the international athletics scene at the 1956 Summer Olympics, where he missed the bronze medal in the 10,000 metres by 7.4 seconds, finishing fourth. At the 1958 European Championships in Athletics, Krzyszkowiak established himself as one of the best European long distance runners by winning both the 5000 and 10,000 metres. In 1958, he became the first winner of the European Sportsperson of the Year conferred by the Polish Press Agency.

Just two months before the Rome Olympics, Krzyszkowiak ran his first world record, clocking 8:31.4 in the 3000 m steeplechase. At the Olympics itself, Krzyszkowiak finished seventh in the 10,000 m, but won, as a main favourite, the 3000 m steeplechase.

After the Olympics, Krzyszkowiak decided to concentrate on the 3000 m steeplechase event, running his second world record in 1961, but was forced to retire from sports prematurely in 1963 due to injuries. After his running career, he worked as a coach.

Zdzisław Krzyszkowiak died in Warsaw, aged 73.

Zdzisław Krzyszkowiak Stadium in Bydgoszcz was named in his honor.

References

1929 births
2003 deaths
Olympic athletes of Poland
Polish male middle-distance runners
Polish male long-distance runners
Athletes (track and field) at the 1956 Summer Olympics
Athletes (track and field) at the 1960 Summer Olympics
Olympic gold medalists for Poland
World record setters in athletics (track and field)
Recipients of the Olympic Order
People from Grodzisk Wielkopolski County
Polish male steeplechase runners
European Athletics Championships medalists
Sportspeople from Greater Poland Voivodeship
Medalists at the 1960 Summer Olympics
Olympic gold medalists in athletics (track and field)
Zawisza Bydgoszcz athletes
People from Ostróda
20th-century Polish people